Bang Khun Si is a khwaeng (subdistrict) of Bangkok Noi District, in Bangkok, Thailand. In 2019, it had a total population of 31,689 people.

Naming
The name is derived from a canal that runs through the west area, Khlong Bang Khun Si, also known as Khlong Chak Phra.

Geography
Bang Khun Si covers the central-southwest area of Bangkok Noi, with a total area of 4.360 km2 (1.683 mi2), regarded as the largest subdistrict of Bangkok Noi.

The area is bordered by neighbouring subdistricts (from north clockwise): Bang Khun Non in its district (Southern Railway Line is borderline), Siri Rat and Ban Chang Lo in its district (Charan Sanit Wong Road is a borderline), Wat Tha Phra in Bangkok Yai District (Khlong Mon is a borderline), Khuha Sawan in Phasi Charoen District (Khlong Bang Chueak Nang is a borderline), Khlong Chak Phra in Taling Chan District (Khlong Chak Phra is a borderline), respectively.

References

Subdistricts of Bangkok
Bangkok Noi district